LaTourette House is a historic home located at New Springville, Staten Island, New York.  It was built in 1836 in a late Federal / early Greek Revival style.  It is a large, sturdy gable roofed brick farmhouse with stone trim. In 1928 the house and 500 acres were purchased by New York City for a golf course and the house was converted to a clubhouse.  The large, white "L" shaped wood porch and one story extension were added in 1936 as part of a Work Projects Administration restoration project.

It was added to the National Register of Historic Places in 1982.

References

Houses on the National Register of Historic Places in Staten Island
Federal architecture in New York (state)
Houses completed in 1836